Kodungoor is a town in Kottayam district of Kerala state in India and is popularly known as "Vazhoor". The Kollam-Theni road (NH 183) passes through the town. SH 13 (Kottayam Kumily Road) branches out at Kodungoor junction leading to Pala and Manimala, after the junction a little further KK road also branches out towards Changanassery. Thus Kodungoor town plays a vital role in connecting some major towns in Kottayam through roads averaging at 25 km distances.

Kodungoor Devi Temple

Kodungoor is famous because of Kodungoor Devi Temple situated close to the town and is one of the most ancient  temples  in the  state. Its antiquity is estimated to be about 200 years. Originally this temple was associated with madathil family who was said to have built the temple and the Kaaraanma right is vested with the Malayala Brahmins of Karikunnath Illom. Until recently the puja of this temple was performed exclusively by members of this family.  Later the temple came under the administration of the Travancore Devaswom Board. There are several legends associated with this temple and on the etymology of the name, Kodungoor. It is one of the main temples visited by Sabarimala pilgrims traveling via Erumeli.kodungoor devi temple is one of the resting place for sabarimala pilgrims during mandalakalam.

According to legend , the place got its name when the Devi (a goddess) came here following her firm devotee, a Kartha who was travelling. After resting a while Kartha tried to lift his palm leaf umbrella to continue his travel, but he couldn't lift it because of the divine presence of the Almighty goddess. And thus a temple was built there for the Devi who stayed, The place thus came to be known as Kuda Thangiya Oor (the land where the umbrella got stuck) and later brevetted as Kodungoor.

Educational institutions
Kodungoor town has several schools and one college near the town run by Nair Services Society. Vazhoor Government High school situated heart of Kodungoor.  Sree Vidhyadhiraja N.S.S. College (one of the seniormost college run by Nair Service Society) & S.V.R.V.N.S.S. Higher Secondary School (Aided) run by Nair Service Society are situated 2 km from Kodungoor Town.  Vidhyanadha Vidyabhavan English Medium School run by Bharatheeya Vidhya Bhavan is also situated 500 m near to Kodungoor Town.  CSI church is also near the town. An Engineering College & ITI is situated near Pallickathode, which is just 5 km away from Kodungoor, on the way to Pala.

Hospital

Thiruvalla Medical Mission Hospital is the first hospital in the area. Also a Primary Health Centre, Govt veterinary & Govt. Homeo Dispensary are situated in the town. There are also some ayurvedic clinics. Pharmacy and medical stores are located in the town.

Government offices
The major Government Offices situated in the Kodungoor town are:
1.  Vazhoor Grama Panchayat Office
2.  Vazhoor Post Office
3.  Sub Registrar Office, Vazhoor
4.  ICDS Office, Vazhoor
5.  Government Press, Vazhoor
6.  B.S.N.L. Office, Vazhoor
7.  K.S.F.E. Vazhoor Branch
8.  Village Office, Vazhoor
9.  K.S.E.B. Sub Division, Vazhoor
10. Veterinary Hospital, Vazhoor
11. Panchayat Library, Vazhoor
12.P.W.D Roads Section, Vazhoor
13. Government Press, Vazhoor

Financial institutions

The major financial institutions situated in the Kodungoor town are:

State Bank of India, Central Bank of India; Vazhoor Farmers Service Cooperative Bank Ltd.; Kodungoor Main branch; Vazhoor Farmers Service Cooperative Bank Ltd. Kodungoor M&E Branch; Changanacherry Taluk Cooperative Agricultural & Rural Development Bank; Kerala State Financial Enterprises (KSFE); Muthoot Finance Ltd; Manappuram Finance Ltd.; Pensioners Employees Cooperative Society Vazhoor; Kerala Gramin Bank, Kodungoor

Topography
Kodungoor town is situated on a scenic hilly terrain and has rich vegetation covering the area, majorly consisting of rubber plantations. No major natural water bodies run through the town, but has an abundant natural underground source of fresh water supply, not only filling up the wells and bore wells but also nurturing the greenery around.

Kodungoor is well connected to all major places like Pala, Manimala, Pallickathode, Pampady, Changanacherry, Ponkunnam, Ranni, Kanjirappally, Mundakayam, and Kottayam through Road.

On travelling to Kumily, Kodungoor is a small town just before Ponkunnam. For pilgrims to Sabarimala, kodungoor is an intermediate stop. There is an easier route to Sabarimala through Kodungoor. Also, the Devi Temple offers space to take rest & there is a big pond near the Temple which is open to Public.

Kodungoor is a major point on the way to Sabarimala Temple of Lord Ayyappa.
Kodungoor is in Vazhoor Panchayath of Kottayam district. Vazhoor panchayath office is located at Kodungoor. Vazhoor Post Office is also situated in same building of panchayath office.

A network of roads that are connected to some major towns in kottayam is the speciality of kodungoor turning it into a transport hub.
K S R T C buses and private buses are available 24 hours in between Kottayam and Kumaly (through Kodungoor).
Also Bus services are available along Kodungoor-Pala road and Kodungoor-Manimala road.
There are also an auto and taxi stand.
There is a petrol pump located at the junction.

References

Villages in Kottayam district